Pernilla Wittung-Stafshede (maiden name Wittung) is a Swedish biophysical chemist, born in 1968, who is a professor of chemical biology at Chalmers University of Technology in Gothenburg. In 2019 she was named by International Union of Pure and Applied Chemistry as a Distinguished Woman in Chemistry.

Education
She received her Master of Science Degree in Engineering from Chalmers University of Technology and a doctorate at the same institution in 1996 in biophysical chemistry under Bengt Nordén, with a thesis entitled Intelligent nucleic acid interactions with peptide nucleic acids and in recombination proteins.

Employment
After her Ph.D., she worked for twelve years in the United States at the California Institute of Technology, Beckman Institute in Pasadena, California (1997–98), Tulane University in New Orleans, Louisiana (1999-2003) and Rice University in Houston, Texas (2004-2008).

In 2008, she returned to Sweden to a professor position at Umeå University. Since September 2015, she has been a professor at Chalmers University of Technology and is the head of the Chemical Biology division. She leads a research group that focuses on the biophysical properties of proteins; both metal-transporting proteins and proteins that fold incorrectly and clump together. The research is basic science, but has links to diseases such as Alzheimer's, Parkinson's and cancer.

In 2010, Pernilla Wittung-Stafshede was one of ten researchers in Sweden who was appointed as a Wallenberg Scholar, with a five-year grant awarded by the Knut and Alice Wallenberg Foundation.

In 2017 she was elected a member of the council of Biophysical Society (BPS). It was the second time ever for a Swedish scientist; the first one was Arne Engström 1960–1963.

Awards and honors 
Pernilla Wittung-Stafshede has received a number of awards and prizes. These include:

 National Fresenius Award in 2003, awarded by the American Chemical Society Phi Lambda Upsilon to young eminent chemistry researchers.
 Göran Gustafsson Prize in Chemistry in 2009, awarded by the Göran Gustafsson Foundation and the Royal Swedish Academy of Sciences.
 Wallmark Prize in 2009, awarded by the Royal Swedish Academy of Sciences.
 STIAS fellow in 2013, awarded by the Stellenbosch Institute for Advanced Studies, South Africa.
 Svante Arrhenius plaque in 2016, awarded by the Swedish Chemical Society in collaboration with the Royal Swedish Academy of Sciences.
 Elected member of the Royal Swedish Academy of Sciences, 2016.
 Elected member of the Royal Society of Arts and Sciences in Gothenburg, 2016.
 2016 International Union of Pure and Applied Chemistry Distinguished Woman in Chemistry

Bibliography 
 Natura: [for secondary school grades].  Biology 3, Life in development, co-author of the chapter A researcher tells, Liber, Stockholm, 1997, pp 88–89  
 Protein Folding and Metal Ions - Mechanisms, Biology and Disease Editors: Pernilla Wittung-Stafshede, C. Gomes Taylor & Francis Books Inc. Oct 22, 2010 under imprint CRC Press

Scientific articles  
Pernilla Wittung-Stafshede has published more than 200 scientific articles in peer-reviewed journals (January 2017).

Debate articles  
Is the Gender Gap Solved in Liberal Sweden? Debate article, published on STEM Women website.

Academia in Sweden is not as equal as you think. Debate article in Swedish in the Swedish Research Council’s web magazine Curie.

Other  
In 2016, she was a guest blogger for the Research Council's web magazine Curie.

References

External links 
 Pernilla Wittung-Stafshede’s personal page on Chalmers website
 Publications registered for Pernilla Wittung in Chalmers Publication Database, CPL (1994-1997)
 Publications registered for Pernilla Wittung-Stafshede in the Chalmers Publication Database, CPL (1998-now)
 Chemical Biology, division in the Biology and Biological Engineering department at Chalmers University of Technology
 Wittung-Stafshede’s Protein Biophysics Lab, Chalmers University of Technology
 

1968 births
Living people
Swedish biochemists
Swedish women chemists
Academic staff of the Chalmers University of Technology
Chalmers University of Technology alumni